Teresa Villaverde (born 18 May 1966) is a Portuguese film director. Her film Os Mutantes was screened in the Un Certain Regard section at the 1998 Cannes Film Festival.

Filmography
A Idade Maior (1991)
Três Irmãos (1994)
Os Mutantes (1998)
Água e Sal (2001)
A Favor da Claridade (2004) 
Visions of Europe (2004) 
Transe (2006)
Swan (2011)
Bridges of Sarajevo (2014)
Paris 15/16
Colo (2017)
O Termometro de Galileu (2018)
Six Portraits of Pain (2019)
Où en êtes-vou, Teresa Villaverde? (2019)

Awards
Nominated for the Golden Globe, Portugal in 1999 for Best Director in Os Mutantes.
Nominated for the Golden Globe, Portugal in 1999 for Best Film in Os Mutantes.
Nominated for the Golden Globe, Portugal in 2007 for Best Film in Transe.

References

1966 births
Living people
People from Lisbon
Portuguese people of Spanish descent
Portuguese film directors
Portuguese women film directors
German-language film directors
Commanders of the Order of Merit (Portugal)
Golden Globes (Portugal) winners